Yeom Han-woong (born 5 December 1966) is a South Korean physicist. A tenured professor at POSTECH, he has led several research centers for the university and from 2013 in collaboration with the Institute for Basic Science. He is a Fellow of the American Physical Society and has served as vice chairman of the Korean government's first science and technology advisory group for three consecutive terms. With more than 300 publications to his name, his research has been cited over 5,000 times giving him an h-index of 40 and i10-index of 125.

Career
He was born in Seoul, and studied physics as an undergraduate at Seoul National University before going on to Tohoku University in Japan as a doctoral student. Thereafter he was a research associate at the Department of Chemistry, University of Tokyo (1996–2000). He then returned to his native South Korea, where he was an assistant/associate professor at the Department of Physics, Yonsei University (2000–2009), and then a full professor (2009–2010). During his time at Yonsei, he was part of a research team that developed a semiconductor nanometer wire with a thickness of 1 to 3 atoms.

Afterwards he moved to the Department of Physics, POSTECH (2010–present), where he served as director of Center for Atomic Wires and Layers (2003–2012), director of Center for Low Dimensional Electronic Symmetries (2012–2013), and founding director of Center for Artificial Low Dimensional Electronic Systems, Institute for Basic Science (2013–present).

Awards
1999: Young Researcher of the Year, Japanese Society for Synchrotron Radiation Research
2006: Outstanding Faculty of the Year, Yonsei University
2006: Scientist and Engineer of the Month, Ministry of Science and Technology 
2007: Academic Achievement Award, Korean Physical Society
2007: Honored Invitation as Young Scientist of Asia, Japanese Society of Applied Physics
2010: Outstanding Referee (Lifetime honor), American Physical Society
2012: Leading Korean Research Scientist, Korean Academy of Science and Technology
2015: Korea Science Award, President of Korea
2016: Inchon Award for Science and Technology, Inchon Foundation and Dong-A Daily Newspaper
2017: Kyung-Ahm Prize in Natural Science, Kyung-Ahm Prize Foundation

Selected publications
Self-Assembled Nanowires with Giant Rashba Split Bands. Phys. Rev. Lett. 110, 036801 (2013).
Topological Solitons versus Nonsolitonic Phase Defects in a Quasi-One-Dimensional Charge-Density Wave. Phys. Rev. Lett. 109, 246802 (2012).
Radial band structure of electrons in liquid metals. Phys. Rev. Lett. 107, 136402 (2011).
Nearly Massless Electrons in the Silicon Interface with a Metal Film. Phys. Rev. Lett. 104, 246803 (2010).
Giant kink in the electron dispersion of strongly coupled lead nanowires. Nano Lett. 9, 1916 (2009).

References

External links
 IBS Center for Artificial Low Dimensional Electronic Systems
 Han Woong Yeom - Google Scholar

1966 births
Living people
Seoul National University alumni
Tohoku University alumni
Academic staff of Yonsei University
South Korean physicists
Paju Yeom clan
Institute for Basic Science
Academic staff of Pohang University of Science and Technology
Pohang University of Science and Technology alumni